Miškovci is a village in the municipality of Derventa, Bosnia and Herzegovina located 4 km Northeast of Donji Smrtići.

References

Villages in Republika Srpska
Populated places in Derventa